Heterostigma is a genus of ascidian tunicates in the family Pyuridae.

Species within the genus Heterostigma include:
 Heterostigma fagei Monniot C. & Monniot F., 1961 
 Heterostigma gonochorica Monniot F., 1965 
 Heterostigma mediterranea Pérès, 1958 
 Heterostigma melitensis Monniot F. & Monniot C., 1976 
 Heterostigma reptans Monniot C. & Monniot F., 1963 
 Heterostigma separ Ärnbäck, 1924

Species names currently considered to be synonyms:
 Heterostigma gravellophila Peres, 1955: synonym of Cratostigma gravellophila (Pérès, 1955) 
 Heterostigma singulare (Van Name, 1912): synonym of Cratostigma singularis (Van Name, 1912) 
 Heterostigma singularis (Van Name, 1912): synonym of Cratostigma singularis (Van Name, 1912)

References

Stolidobranchia
Tunicate genera